Tina Kandelaki (born 10 November 1975) is a Russian journalist, television presenter, producer, and a co-owner of the Apostol company.

Biography 
Kandelaki was born in Tbilisi, Georgia. Tina’s father, Givi Kandelaki (1942–2009), a Georgian economist and the director of a vegetable depot in Tbilisi, moved to Moscow upon retirement. Her father is of half Georgian and half Greek origin. Kandelaki's mother, Elvira Kandelaki (maiden name Alakhverdova), is a narcologist of half Armenian and half Turkish descent. 

Kandelaki graduated from high school #64 in Tbilisi. In 1993, Tina enrolled in Tbilisi State University, where she studied journalism. In 2008, she graduated from the Foreign Affairs Department of the Russian State University for the Humanities.

On 26 November, 2006, Kandelaki was involved in a car accident in Nice, France. Kandelaki was a passenger of a Ferrari Enzo driven by Russian businessman and oligarch Suleyman Kerimov when the car went off road and crashed into a tree. The cause of the car accident is unknown. Kerimov was seriously injured and rushed to hospital.

TV and radio 

Kandelaki worked for Radio 105 in Tbilisi, Georgia, until 1995, when she began working for television and radio stations in Moscow, including M-radio, RDV, Silver Rain Radio, 2x2, Biz-TV, Muz-TV, Vremechko and TV-6. In September 2002, Kandelaki hosted the talk show Details on the STS channel. In February 2003, Kandelaki hosted the TV show The Cleverest.

In 2006, Kandelaki, together with Sergey Dorenko presented a weekly political program on Echo of Moscow (Russian radio station). In 2008, she hosted Unreal Politics, a show that was aired on NTV. The show started as an experimental online project. In 2009, she hosted Two Stars, a TV show on Channel One. In the same year, she worked as a producer of Infomania, a TV program on STS. Also in 2009, she dubbed Juarez, one of the guinea pigs of the G-Force movie by Walt Disney Pictures. In 2010, she was a jury member of KVN Top-league (a TV game show).

Also in 2010, she was a TV-host for the show Perfect Man (STS Channel). She was also a jury member of Bolshaya Raznitsa a parody show hosted in Odessa. (Russia One channel). From September 22, 2010 to January 19, 2011, she hosted the author's program "Alternatina" on the radio station Vesti FM, together with the chief producer of that radio Anatoly Kuzichev. In December 2012, the television game The Cleverest, which she hosted since 2003, came to an end.

From February 17 to June 2013, together with Margarita Simonyan, she hosted of the political talk show on NTV, "Iron Ladies".  From September 17, 2020 to February 16, 2022, she was the host of the "Special Guest" program on the RTVI. On September 8, 2021, she was appointed Deputy General Director of Gazprom Media and Managing Director of Gazprom Media Entertainment Television. On February 9, 2022, she was appointed acting director of the TNT channel.

Public activities 
In November 2007, Kandelaki condemned the policy of Georgian president Mikheil Saakashvili. “A man who acted as a mouthpiece for democracy in Georgia turned out to be a medieval tyrant”.

Since October 2009, Kandelaki is a member of the Public Chamber of the Russian Federation by invitation of Russian President Dmitry Medvedev.

In 2011, Kandelaki signed “Letter 55” (a public address from public representatives against the informational undermining of public trust in the Russian judicial system) which condemned the pressure put on the judicial system during the trials against the heads of the Yukos Oil Company.

In August 2019, Kandelaki accused Katy Perry of trying to kiss her at a private party.

In February 2022, Kandelaki expressed support for the Russian invasion of Ukraine. On 18 March 2022, she spoke at Vladimir Putin's Moscow rally celebrating the annexation of Crimea from Ukraine and justifying Russia's full-scale invasion. In June 2022, together with her husband Vasily Brovko, she was included in the OFAC's SDN List.

Business 
Tina Kandelaki is partner and co-owner of Apostol Media Group, a television production and public relations company. Kandelaki is the owner of “Tinatin”, a restaurant opened in Moscow in 2010. The recipes used in the menu of the restaurant have reportedly been passed down from Kandelaki’s mother. From May to November 2011, Kandelaki was on the board of directors of Vyatka-bank. On 29 January 2012, Kandelaki launched a political talk-show with video blogger Dmitry Kamikadze – “A flight with Kamikadze”. Kandelaki is the producer of the program. In March 2012, Kandelaki signed a contract with cosmetics company Oriflame.

Filmography 
 2004 – Dazhe ne Dumai. Den’ nezavisimosti – correspondent.
 2004 – My Fair Nanny (Russian TV series) - cameo
 2005 – Ne Rodis' Krasivoy (the Russian version of Ugly Betty), small cameo as a spokesperson for Zimaletto company
 2007 – Папины дочки, a small cameo
 2009 – The Forbidden Reality, a small cameo
 2009 – Moriachok, a music video of the Russian band Nochniye Snaiperi
 2011 – Mama-Moskva (in process) – Sanya Sadovaya
 2011 – Odnazhdy v Baben-babene (in process)
 2011 – Svetophor, cameo

Dubbing 
 2009 – G-force, dubbed a guinea pig named Juarez
 2008 – Asterix at the Olympic Games, dubbed the Greek Princess Irina

Video clips 
 2009 – Moriachok, a music video from the Russian band “Nochniye Snaiperi”

References

External links

 Official Site
 Tina Kandelaki's LiveJournal
 Eating with the enemy: why Russia loves Georgian food, The Independent, March 10, 2010
 Chechen leader wants women covered to prevent 'distractions', The Independent, February 1, 2011
Tina Kandelaki at the Forbes

1975 births
Film people from Tbilisi
Living people
Journalists from Tbilisi
Russian television presenters
Russian journalists
Russian women television presenters
Russian women journalists
Georgian people of Armenian descent
Georgian people of Greek descent
Georgian people of Turkish descent
Russian people of Armenian descent
Russian people of Greek descent
Russian people of Turkish descent
Members of the Civic Chamber of the Russian Federation
Russian State University for the Humanities alumni
Anti-Ukrainian sentiment in Russia
Russian socialites